Field Hockey will be among the sports at the 13th Africa Games to held in August 2023 in Accra, Ghana. The play will feature both a men's and women's tournament. The winners of each tournament will qualify for the 2024 Summer Olympics.

Qualification

Men

Women

References

2023 African Games
African Games
Field hockey at the African Games
African Games
2024
2023 African Games
African Games